Arinaldo Rrapaj (born 9 August 2001) is an Albanian footballer who plays as a midfielder for First Professional Football League (Bulgaria) club Ludogorets Razgrad on loan at Albanian Team Partizani Tirana playing in Kategoria Superiore ,and the Albania national team.

Career

Flamurtari
A graduate of the club's youth academy, Rrapaj made his Albanian Superliga debut on 19 May 2018, playing the entirety of a 2-1 home defeat to Partizani Tirana.

Partizani Tirana
Rrapaj spent the 2020–21 season with Skënderbeu, making 30 league appearances for the club. In June 2021, he joined Partizani Tirana, signing a three-year deal with an optional extension for a fourth year.

References

External links

2001 births
Living people
Flamurtari Vlorë players
KF Skënderbeu Korçë players
FK Partizani Tirana players
Kategoria Superiore players
Albania youth international footballers
Albania under-21 international footballers
Albania international footballers
Association football midfielders
Footballers from Vlorë
Albanian footballers